Dibër Street (formerly Rruga Bajram Curri) is a major street in Tirana, Albania. It runs northeast from the central Skanderbeg Square, just south of the Tirana International Hotel. The Mother Teresa Hospital (QSUT) is located on this street.

References

Streets in Tirana